Flight to Fame is a 1938 American action film directed by Charles C. Coleman. It stars Charles Farrell, Julie Bishop, and Hugh Sothern.

Cast
 Charles Farrell as Capt. Robert Lawrence
 Julie Bishop as Barbara Fiske (credited as Jacqueline Wells)
 Hugh Sothern as Dr. Harlan Fiske
 Alexander D'Arcy as Perez
 Jason Robards Sr. as Muller (credited as Jason Robards)
 Charles D. Brown as Maj. Loy
 Addison Richards as Col. King
 Frederick Burton as Gen. Darrow
 Selmer Jackson as Jules Peabody
 Reed Howes as Roy Curran
 Dutch Hendrian as Sound Sergeant (uncredited)
 Eddie Kane as Officer (uncredited)
 Malcolm 'Bud' McTaggart as Page Boy (uncredited)
 James Millican as Pilot (uncredited)
 Lee Prather as Officer (uncredited)
 Edwin Stanley as Minor Role (uncredited)
 Vernon Steele as Officer (uncredited)

References

External links

1938 films
American action films
1930s action films
Films directed by Charles C. Coleman
American black-and-white films
Columbia Pictures films
1930s American films